Matteo Donati (born 28 February 1995) is an Italian professional tennis player. On 13 April 2015, he reached the final of the ATP Challenger Tour Napoli Cup to claim a career-high of no. 247 on the ATP World Tour Singles rankings.

Professional career

2015
Donati's first big professional result came in Naples at the 2015 Tennis Napoli Cup. As a wildcard, the Italian defeated Axel Michon in straight sets in the first round, World number 111 (former n. 33) and number 1 seed Andrey Golubev 6–7(3), 6–4, 6–2 in the following round, and fellow Italian Andrea Arnaboldi in a thriller three-setter in the quarterfinals. Donati then reached his first ATP Challenger Tour final (beating Marco Cecchinato 7–6(5), 6–2 in the semifinals) where he lost to Daniel Muñoz de la Nava in straight sets.

In May Donati obtained a wildcard into the main draw of the 2015 Internazionali BNL d'Italia, in Rome. Playing for the first time in a Master 1000 tournament (also his first ATP match), Donati fought back – from a set down – to beat World number 49 Santiago Giraldo 2–6, 6–1, 6–4.

ATP Challenger and ITF Futures finals

Singles: 10 (5–5)

Doubles: 10 (7–3)

Junior Grand Slam finals

Doubles: 1 (1 runner-up)

Performance timeline

Singles

References

External links

1995 births
Living people
People from Alessandria
Italian male tennis players
Sportspeople from the Province of Alessandria